Lower Mill is a historic grist mill located at Honeoye Falls in Monroe County, New York, USA. The 3- to -story stone structure was built about 1829.  The mill operated into the 1930s, and the structure was subsequently used by a creamery, oil company, and for community use. A restaurant and gallery now operates in the structure.

It was listed on the National Register of Historic Places in 1973.

References

External links
The Lower Mill & The Rabbit Room Restaurant - Honeoye Falls, NY

Grinding mills on the National Register of Historic Places in New York (state)
Industrial buildings completed in 1829
Buildings and structures in Monroe County, New York
Grinding mills in New York (state)
National Register of Historic Places in Monroe County, New York